the 2023 CAFA Women's Futsal Championship is an international women's futsal tournament to be held in Tashkent, Uzbekistan from 25 to 31 January 2023. The four women's national teams involved in the tournament were required by Central Asian Football Association (CAFA) to register a squad of 14 players, including at least two goalkeepers.

This article lists the women's national futsal squads that take part in the tournament. The age listed for each player is as of January 25, 2023, the first day of the tournament.

Teams

Iran
Head coach: Forouzan Soleimani

Kyrgyz Republic
Head coach: Oleg Gevlenko

Tajikistan
Head coach:  Mustafo Afshori

Uzbekistan
Head coach: Farrukh Zakirov

References

External links
 Official website

Futsal in Uzbekistan